Hard Yakka is an Australian clothing company. It was founded in 1935 as D. K. Laidlaw & Sons Pty Ltd, but later adopted the name "Yakka", a loanword from the Yagara language ( "work") that had entered Australian English in the late 19th century. The company is one of the largest suppliers of work wear in the southern hemisphere, providing a large range of products. Since its inception, the company has expanded its work wear ranges to include Foundations, Legends, Koolgear, Protect FR and 3056: Born in Brunswick. The company also supplies a range of accessories and safety footwear.

Hard Yakka was acquired by Pacific Brands in 2007, and then later it was acquired by Wesfarmers as part of the Workwear Group in 2014 along with KingGee and Stubbies workwear. Hard Yakka was the outfitter of the 2006 Melbourne Commonwealth Games and the 2018 Gold Coast Commonwealth Games.

References

External links

Australian companies established in 1935
Clothing companies established in 1935
Clothing brands of Australia
Wesfarmers
Workwear